Operation Taurus was the name of a planned prosecution by the Royal Ulster Constabulary (RUC) against Martin McGuinness.

Taurus was to be based on allegations arising from the 1993 broadcast of an edition of the "Cook Report" presented by Roger Cook and involving Freddie Scappaticci ("Stakeknife") and the testimony of three witnesses prepared to testify for the Crown.

The operation was abandoned in August 1997 and no charges were made, as it was determined to be not in the public interest. This was taken to be because McGuinness was in negotiations for the Northern Ireland peace process. However, some allege that it was because McGuinness was a British spy.

References

Prosecution
The Troubles (Northern Ireland)
Royal Ulster Constabulary